Michael C. B. Ashley is an Australian astronomer and professor in the school of physics at the University of New South Wales, in Sydney. He is most famous for his work in Antarctica,  with the study of the seeing capability at Dome C.

Antarctica and Dome C
In September 2004, Nature published a report written by Jon Lawrence, Michael Ashley, Andrei Tokovinin, and Tony Travouillon on the seeing abilities of astronomical telescopes in Antarctica. The paper concluded that Dome C would be "the best ground-based site to develop a new astronomical observatory." The data used in this report was collected by a remote control experiment run through the French-Italian Concordia Station near Dome C. However, Ashley and his team have been to Antarctica on four separate trips, in 1995, 1998, 2001, and 2004 for earlier experiments, such as measurements of the near-infrared quality of the brightness of the sky. It was found that pictures taken from a telescope at Dome C are, on average, 2.5 times better than those taken at observatories elsewhere. This discovery has been lauded as finding the clearest skies on Earth.

Publications
Scopus lists 197 academic papers written by Ashley, and calculates his h-index as 35, while Google Scholar calculates his h-index as 46.

References

External links
Michael Ashley's homepage, on the UNSW website
An FAQ on the results found at Dome C
An interview with Michael Ashley

21st-century Australian astronomers
Living people
Year of birth missing (living people)
Academic staff of the University of New South Wales